Chumalya (Sümälä) is a rural locality (a village) in Mikhaylovsky Selsoviet, Bakalinsky District, Bashkortostan, Russia. The population was 65 as of 2010. There is 1 street.

Geography 
Chumalya is located 26 km south of Bakaly (the district's administrative centre) by road. Nizhneye Novokosteyevo is the nearest rural locality.

References 

Rural localities in Bakalinsky District